Bernabe Villacampo (Filipinas June 11, 1943-June 4, 2022) was a Philippine boxer who took the WBA World Flyweight Championship in a fifteen round Unanimous Decision on October 19, 1969 against Japanese boxer Hiroyuki Ebihara at the Prefectural Gymnasium, in Osaka, Japan. Villacampo's business manager was Lope Sarreal Jr. A strong puncher, he knocked out opponents in 40% of the matches he won.

Early life and career
Villacampo started out as a vendor selling ice drops, rice puffs, and newspapers. Hawking newspapers and working as vendors were common part time professions for young boxers, and a frequent trade of American boxers in the early twentieth century. At 19, he started boxing as an amateur in tournaments representing his school, the University of Visayas, to supplement the paltry living he made as a vendor.

By the time he turned twenty in 1963, he was clearly competing as a professional. Between August 1962 and July 1965 he fought mostly in Cebu, Philippines, his hometown, or occasionally on the Philippine's big island, Luzon. He won fourteen of his first nineteen fights during this period.

Moving up in recognition and the level of his competition, he scored an upset sixth round knockout against Japanese boxer Katsuyoshi Takayama on November 6, 1967, in Okayama, Japan.

On May 15, 1968, he fought a twelve round draw for the Oriental and Pacific Boxing Federation (OPBF) Flyweight Championship against Tsuyoshi Nakamura in Tokyo, Japan.

Attempt at the WBC World Flyweight Championship

On November 10, 1968, he made an unsuccessful attempt at the WBC Flyweight Championship against Chartchai Chionoi.  He lost in a fifteen round Unanimous Decision in Bangkok, Thailand. Chionoi immediately announced his retirement after the win, his fourth title defense, stating, "I am tired of the fightgame and feel sick and unwell."  Chionoi did not retire and fought on to win the title two more times before finally retiring in 1974. Chionoi survived his boxing career, though suffers from Parkinson's in his retirement.

Taking the WBA World Flyweight Championship
He took the WBA World Flyweight Championship in a fifteen round Unanimous Decision on October 19, 1969 against Japanese boxer Hiroyuki Ebihara at the Prefectural Gymnasium, in Osaka, Japan. He stunned the enthusiastic Japanese crowd in Osaka by claiming the title against the heavy hometown favorite.

Boxing while WBA Flyweight Champion
While still champion on December 14, 1969 he was defeated in a non-title fight by Masao Oba in a ten round Uanimous Decision in Tokyo, Japan.

On February 7, 1970, in a non-title fight in Manila he won a ten round Unanimous Decision against Raton Mojica of Nicaragua.

Losing the WBA World Flyweight Championship to Berkrerk Chartvanchai
In his first title defense, he lost the WBA World Flyweight Championship in a close fifteen round Split Decision on April 5, 1970 against Thai boxer Berkrerk Chartvanchai in Bangkok, Thailand.  The loss dropped Villacampo to third in the World ratings. As the Philippines was and had been an American protectorate, many American papers covered Villacampo's loss, though in short paragraphs, with minimal detail. In a close bout, the Associated Press had the scoring 73-70 for Chartvanchai. Chartvanchai used primarily body punches and solid defense to take the title. He made Villicampo miss repeatedly and scored frequently with blows to the torso. In the eighth he opened a cut above Villacampo's eye that bothered his opponent throughout the remainder of the bout. One source noted "Villicampo...was the more aggressive but could not land telling blows." Many of Chartvanchai's best scoring punches were quick strikes to the torso after breaking out of clinches.

Losing to Betulio Gonzalez
On December 21, 1970, he entered a WBA Flyweight Title Elimination tournament. In one of his most important contests, he lost a Split Decision against future 3-time world champion Betulio Gonzalez of Venezuela in Caracas. Gonzalez was the Venezuelan Flyweight Champion at the time.  Had Villacampo won the bout, he would probably have had the opportunity to meet Japanese Flyweight World Title Holder Masao Ohba for the title the following year.

On May 13, 1971, he outpointed Beaver Kajimoto in a ten round bout in Tokyo, Japan.

Boxing for the Philippine's Game and Amusement Board's Flyweight Title
On January 31, 1976, he lost to Rolando Navarette, in a second round TKO in Cebu, Philippines.

On June 24, 1977, he won the Philippines Games and Amusement Board's (GAB) Flyweight Title by defeating Arnel Arrozal in a fourth round technical knockout in Manila.

On March 7, 1978 he won a fourth round knockout in an important bout against 1980 World Light Flyweight Champion Shigeo Nakajima in Tokyo, Japan.

On July 1, 1978 he fought a GAB Flyweight title fight to a twelve round draw against Julius Gonzaga at Davao City, Davao del Sur, Philippines.  On August 28, 1978, he relinquished the GAB Flyweight Title, the equivalent of the Philippines National Flyweight Championship to Gonzaga against at Davao City, Davao del Sur, Philippines in a seventh of twelve round knockout.

After his fifth round knockout loss on November 24, 1979 to Danilo Inocian, at Cotabato del Sur, Philippines, he retired from boxing.

Boxing achievements and honors

In another honor, Villacampo was named fighter of the month by the World Boxing Association in December 1969.

References 

World Boxing Association champions
World flyweight boxing champions
Flyweight boxers
World boxing champions
1943 births
Filipino male boxers
Boxers from Cebu
Living people